Kurt Oleska (21 August 1914 – 9 January 1945) was a German basketball player. He competed in the men's tournament at the 1936 Summer Olympics. He was killed in action during World War II.

References

1914 births
1945 deaths
German men's basketball players
Olympic basketball players of Germany
Basketball players at the 1936 Summer Olympics
Sportspeople from Thuringia
German military personnel killed in World War II